The 1949 West Virginia State Yellow Jackets football team was an American football team that represented West Virginia State University as a member of the Colored Intercollegiate Athletic Association (CIAA) during the 1949 college football season. In their fifth season under head coach Mark Cardwell, the team compiled an 8–0–1 record and outscored opponents by a total of 197 to 79. The team ranked No. 3 among the nation's black college football teams according to the Pittsburgh Courier and its Dickinson Rating System. The team played its home games at Lakin Field in Institute, West Virginia.

Key players included quarterback Joe Gilliam, fullback Oliver Ellis, halfbacks Alfred Graves, Charlie Fairfax, and Jack Taylor, ends Clarence "Bump" Clark, Horace Christian, and John Gist, tackle Ed Wickliffe, and kicker Alfred Melchor.

Schedule

References

West Virginia State
West Virginia State Yellow Jackets football seasons
College football undefeated seasons
West Virginia State Yellow Jackets football